Hoseynabad-e Do may refer to:
 Hoseynabad-e Do, Jiroft
 Hoseynabad-e Do, Chatrud, Kerman County
 Hoseynabad-e Do, Sirjan